Susan Glickman (born 1953 at Baltimore) is an American-born Canadian writer and critic. She is a teacher of literature and creative writing, teaching at Toronto Metropolitan University and the University of Toronto.

Career
 Glickman was formerly an English professor at the University of Toronto, where she wrote her doctoral dissertation on Shakespeare's dramaturgy. She also works as an freelance editor, primarily of academic texts.

Glickman's first novel, The Violin Lover, won the Canadian Jewish Book Award for Fiction and was listed as one of the best books of 2006 by The National Post and The Picturesque & the Sublime: A Poetics of the Canadian Landscape (1998) won both the Gabrielle Roy prize for the year's best work of literary criticism and the Raymond Klibansky prize for the year's best work in the humanities. Her essays and reviews have appeared in magazines including Maisonneuve, Brick, Essays on Canadian Writing, The Journal of Canadian Poetry and The University of Toronto Quarterly among others, and her poetry has been translated into French and Greek.

Works

Fiction
 The Violin Lover (2006)
 The Tale-Teller (2012)
 Safe as Houses (2015)
 The Discovery of Flight" (2018)

Poetry
 Complicity (1983; o.p.)
 The Power to Move (1986; o.p.)
 Henry Moore's Sheep and Other Poems (1990)
 Hide & Seek (1995)
 Running in Prospect Cemetery: New & Selected Poems (2004)
 The Smooth Yarrow (2012)
 What We Carry(2019)

Non-fiction
 The Picturesque & the Sublime: A Poetics of the Canadian Landscape (1998)

Juvenile
 Bernadette and the Lunch Bunch (2008)
 Bernadette in the Doghouse (2011)
 Bernadette to the Rescue (2012)

References

External links
 The Author's Website
 The Canadian Poetry Project at University of Toronto Libraries

1953 births
Living people
Canadian women novelists
University of Toronto alumni
Academic staff of the University of Toronto
Jewish Canadian writers
21st-century Canadian novelists
21st-century Canadian women writers